Gao Lian may refer to:
 Gao Lian (dramatist), 16th Century Chinese writer, dramatist and encyclopedist
 Gao Lian (Water Margin), a Water Margin character